Toni Wieser (23 January 1921 – 30 January 1993) was an Austrian ski jumper. He competed in the individual event at the 1948 Winter Olympics.

References

External links
 

1921 births
1993 deaths
Austrian male ski jumpers
Olympic ski jumpers of Austria
Ski jumpers at the 1948 Winter Olympics
People from Bischofshofen
Sportspeople from Salzburg (state)
20th-century Austrian people